Azimio la Umoja–One Kenya Coalition Party, popularly referred as Azimio la Umoja (Swahili: "Resolution for Unity"), or simply Azimio, is a Kenyan political alliance and party headed by Raila Odinga. It is composed of the Orange Democratic Movement, the Jubilee Party, NARC–Kenya and other parties. Former president Uhuru Kenyatta is the party's patron. The alliance fielded Odinga as its presidential candidate and Martha Karua as its deputy presidential candidate in the 2022 Kenyan election, which they lost.

History 
The alliance unveiled their manifesto at Nyayo National Stadium in June 2022.

On 18 August 2022, all 7 MPs, 2 senators, and two governors left Azimio and joined the rival Kenya Kwanza alliance of president-elect William Ruto. The next day, 2 more MPs, one from the UPIA and another from the DAP-K, switched to Kenya Kwanza as well.

After losing the 2022 elections to Kenya Kwanza, Azimio la Umoja became the main opposition alliance.  

On 4 October 2022, Ruto lifted the ban on genetically modified crops, making Kenya the second country in Africa to approve them. Wiper Democratic Movement leader Kalonzo Musyoka has asked the president to reconsider the ban and also urge the clergy to intervene in the matter.

Composition

On 12 April 2022, the alliance consisted of mainly 23 parties:

See also 
Kenya Kwanza

References

Political parties in Kenya
Elections in Kenya
Political party alliances in Kenya
2022 establishments in Kenya
Political parties established in 2022